Asteriscus aquaticus is a species of flowering plant. The flower is part of the so-called "Asteriscus alliance".

Formally known by its basionym, Bupthalmum aquaticum, when it was originally described in 1753 as a species of the Buphthalmum genus. Its original name meant sweet-scented ox eye. The plant is a low-growing annual herb with orange-yellow flowers, native to the Mediterranean region. It flowers between April and June and colonizes dry coastal areas.

See also 
 Buphthalmum salicifolium – one of two species still found within the Buphthalmum genus.
 Pallenis maritima – a closely related species.

References

Further reading 

 
 
 
 
 
 
 

Plants described in 1832
Plants described in 1753
Taxa named by Carl Linnaeus
Flora of Palestine (region)
Flora of Lebanon
aquaticus